John Buchanan McCormick (November 4, 1834 – August 21, 1924) was an American mechanical engineer who invented the first modern mixed flow water turbine, the "Hercules", as well variants including the Holyoke-McCormick, and Achilles turbines. McCormick's advances building upon James B. Francis's designs led to a new era in turbine design, resulting variants of his designs being manufactured across the United States and in Europe. For several years he was engineer and mechanic for the Holyoke Machine Company before resigning, and switching over to work for machinist firm, J. W. Jolly.

Prior to his work on waterwheels, McCormick was a music teacher, teaching classes for numerous schools in Indiana County. While two of his brothers had served in the Union Army, one dying on the battlefield, McCormick considered himself a copperhead, and regarded the abolitionist industrialists of the North as opportunists. In 1868, he would debut at the Bush Hotel in Bellefonte a satirical ballad called "The Ku-Klux-Klan", lampooning what he perceived to be a bogeyman of the Lincoln Republicans which he believed to be no more an enduring threat than the former Know-Nothing Party. He would perform this piece, with moderate success, in 4-5 counties in western Pennsylvania.

After his engineering career in Holyoke, he purchased a large farmhouse in Pennsylvania in 1902 to live with his wife, 40 years his junior, and raise his 2 children. A modest farmhouse, he would expand it from 1902 to 1905, adding a large stone parapet. Today the John B. McCormick House is on the National Register of Historic Places.

References

External links

 Go With the Flow: The Mixed Flow Water Turbine, Pennsylvania Center for the Book
 Patents: US Patent 560,300- Water-wheel Bucket, US Patent 560,301- Water-wheel

1834 births
1924 deaths
People from Blair County, Pennsylvania
People from Holyoke, Massachusetts
People from Indiana County, Pennsylvania
19th-century American inventors
American patent holders
American satirists
Pennsylvania Democrats
Fluid dynamicists
People of the Industrial Revolution